Agatha georgiana is a species of sea snail, a marine gastropod mollusk in the family Pyramidellidae, the pyrams and their allies. The species is one of the two species within the Agatha genus, with the exception of the other related species being Agatha virgo.

Distribution

Marine

References

External links
 To World Register of Marine Species

Pyramidellidae
Gastropods described in 1885